River Plaza may refer to:

River Plaza (skyscraper)
River Plaza, New Jersey
Maritime Museum ferry wharf, formerly known as River Plaza
Gardens of Trout River Plaza